Pareuxoa janae is a moth of the family Noctuidae. It is found in the Magallanes and Antartica Chilena Region of Chile.

The wingspan is 30–35 mm. Adults are on wing from November to February.

External links
 Noctuinae of Chile

Noctuinae
Endemic fauna of Chile